The Jathedar of the Akal Takht is the head of the Akal Takht and head of the Sikhs worldwide. The jathedar has the de facto power as the supreme spokesperson of the Khalsa to summon, trial and sentence any person who identifies as a Sikh from the Akal Takht. 

The current jathedar is Jagtar Singh Hawara, who was declared by the Sarbat Khalsa on 10 November 2015. Due to the political imprisonment of Hawara, Dhian Singh Mand appointed by the Sarbat Khalsa and Harpreet Singh appointed by Shiromani Gurdwara Parbandhak Committee (SGPC) have been serving as the acting jathedars.

The position of jathedar is not established by any constitutional document, but exists only by long-established convention, whereby a Sarbat Khalsa or an institution authorised by it appoints a person most likely to command the confidence of the Sikhs. The jathedar is supported by the Shiromani Gurdwara Parbandhak Committee and heads the other four jathedars of the takhts. The jathedar also commands the Akalis, an armed Sikh warrior order started from the Akal Takht by the sixth Sikh Guru, Guru Hargobind. 

The Akal Takht is the building directly opposite the Darbar Sahib founded by Guru Hargobind, as a symbol of political sovereignty and where spiritual and temporal concerns of the Sikh people can be addressed. Along with Baba Buddha and Bhai Gurdas, the sixth Guru built a concrete slab. When Guru Hargobind revealed the platform on 15 June 1606, he put on two swords: one indicated his spiritual authority (piri) and the other, his temporal authority (miri).

History and development

Title and etymology 
The title is used for a commander of a Sikh military unit and applies to a head of a takht.

Origin
Recognising the necessity of coordinating efforts against the Mughal empire, the Guru simultaneously began the process of militarising the Sikhs. The first hukamnama issued from the Akal Takht on 30 June 1606 commanded the Sikhs to offer arms and horses. The position of jathedar was established, when the Guru appointed Bhai Gurdas as the first custodian of the Akal Takht, which was then known as the Akal Bunga. However, Guru Hargobind had to leave the Akal Takht in 1734 due to the hostilities of the Mughal rulers, and the institution came under the control of the Minas, descendants of Prithi Chand.

Following the establishment of the Khalsa, which took effect on 13 April 1699, the tenth Guru, Guru Gobind Singh sent Bhai Mani Singh to Amritsar with instructions to take possession of the Darbar Sahib and the Akal Takht from the Minas. The Sikhs assigned Bhai Mani Singh as the head granthi of Harmandir Sahib and the jathedar of the Akal Takht. After the passing of Guru Gobind Singh, the Sikh divisions accepted the common leadership and sovereignty of the head of the Akal Takht.

Sarbat Khalsa
In 1733, Zakariya Khan Bahadur attempted to negotiate truce with the Sikhs by offering them a jagir, the title Nawab to their head, and unimpeded access to Amritsar. After discussion at a Sarbat Khalsa, Kapur Singh Virk was chosen head of the Sikhs and took the title of Nawab. He combined the various Sikh militias into two groups; Taruna Dal for under 40 years of age and the Buddha Dal for over 40 years of age, which would collectively be known as Dal Khalsa. The Taruna Dal was further divided in five jathas, each with 1300 to 2000 men and a separate drum and banner. Considering Hari ke Pattan, where the Sutlej and Beas rivers meet as a reference point, the Taruna Dal was assigned to control the eastern area while the Buddha Dal controlled the west. 

On 23 March 1748, a Sarbat Khalsa appointed Jassa Singh Ahluwalia to take the command of Dal Khalsa and become the head of the Sikhs. Ahluwalia proclaimed the title of Sultan-ul-Qaum when the Sikhs under his leadership defeated the Afghan forces of Ahmad Shah Abdali and took Lahore without resistance in September 1761. The 40,000 allied forces of Baghel Singh, Jassa Singh Ahluwalia and Jassa Singh Ramgarhia conquered the Red Fort in Delhi and hoisted the Nishan Sahib atop on 11 March 1783. The condition of their retreat included the construction of seven gurdwaras marking Sikh historical sites in Delhi.

Dispute

A Sarbat Khalsa convened by Sikh organisations opposed to the influence of Shiromani Akali Dal over Sikh religious institutions in 2015 appointed Jagtar Singh Hawara as the Jathedar of Akal Takht. The SGPC president at that time, Avtar Singh Makkar, however condemned the convening as against the principles of Sikhism and it's decisions null and void. He added that the removal of Jathedars came under Sikh Gurdwaras Act, 1925 and no one could challenge the authority of the SGPC. Giani Gurbachan Singh continued to remain in his post until his resignation on 18 October 2018. On 23 October, the SGPC appointed Giani Harpreet Singh as the acting jathedar of Akal Takht.

Qualifications and selection 

The jathedar serves at the Khalsa’s pleasure, meaning the post does not have a fixed term, and once appointed, the jathedar remains in service until they resign, are dismissed, or die.

Chapter IV, Article V of the Sikh Rehat Maryada only permits an initiated Sikh to enter the hallowed enclosures of a takht; therefore, only a  Khalsa Sikh of high regard can become a jathedar. Prior to 1921, jathedars were appointed by the Sarbat Khalsa, a biannual deliberative assembly of the Sikhs held at Amritsar. Since 1921, the jathedar of takhts have generally been appointed by the Shiromani Gurdwara Parbandhak Committee.

Role and authority 
Chapter XIII, Article XXVII of the Sikh Rehat Maryada allows for an appeal against a local decision concerning the Sikhs to be made to the Akal Takht. The jathedar of the Akal Takht has the de facto power to summoned Sikhs including those who hold a position of authority to be trialed. Hukamnamas issued by the jathedar from the Akal Takht which are binding may order an acquittal, penalty or excommunication. The Khalsa can hold individuals accountable for violating the decisions of the Akal Takht.

List 
Colour key

Timeline of jathedars 

The following timeline depicts the progression of the jathedars.

Notes

References 

Articles which contain graphical timelines
Jathedars of Akal Takht
Sikh terminology
Sikh religious workers